Big Business is a 1924 American short silent comedy film directed by Robert F. McGowan. It was the 22nd Our Gang short subject released.

Plot
The gang starts up their own barbershop, giving the neighborhood kids haircuts that would not become popular for another sixty years. When they see Mickey in his Little Lord Fauntleroy outfit, they kidnap him and give him the works. Mickey then decides to join them in their enterprise.

Cast
 Joe Cobb as Joe
 Jackie Condon as Jackie
 Mickey Daniels as Mickey
 Allen Hoskins as Farina
 Mary Kornman as Mary
 Ernest Morrison as Sunshine Sammy
 Andy Samuel as— Andy
 Allan Cavan as office worker
 William Gillespie as Mickey's father
 Lyle Tayo as Mickey's mother

References

External links
 
 
 
 

1924 films
1924 comedy films
1924 short films
American silent short films
American black-and-white films
Films directed by Robert F. McGowan
Hal Roach Studios short films
Our Gang films
1920s American films
Silent American comedy films